Burmese in Malaysia mostly comprise manual labourers and refugees. The 2014 Myanmar Census enumerated 303,996 Burmese individuals living in Malaysia. As of November 2014, there are around 139,200 Burmese refugees in which 50,620 are Chins, 40,070 are Rohingyas, 12,160 Panthays and 7,440 others are Rakhines/Arakaneses. However, the Malaysian government does not officially recognise all newly arrived refugees as it may encourage more to enter Malaysia as Malaysian officials noted they may become a threat to national security. Many of the new workers and refugees have frequently fall into the hand of human traffickers and have been killed by other criminals.

Notable people 
 Nora Danish – Malaysian actress, model and television host.
 Tiara Jacquelina – Malaysian actress and film producer.

See also 
 Burma–Malaysia relations

References

Further reading 
 
 

Burmese
 
Malaysia–Myanmar relations
 
Immigration to Malaysia